Syed Adnan Kakakhail (born 27 September 1975) is a Pakistani Sunni Muslim scholar, columnist and author. He is the founder and CEO of Al-Burhan Institute. He is a recipient presidential award for the "Best Debator of Pakistan".

Career
He is also serving as a member of Iman Islamic Banking's Shariah Board and Head of Shariah Compliance Department at Silkbank Limited.  Since 2006, he has been teaching various Islamic subjects at some of the leading Islamic educational institutions in Pakistan.  He has also served as the Director of the Faculty of Sharia at Jamia tur Rasheed, Karachi (which offers a four-year postgraduate degree program). He is currently a Shariah advisor to an Islamic bank.  Prior to that, he was a Shariah Trainer (2008 to 2011) at  Dubai Islamic Bank Pakistan Limited. He is a columnist for a weekly magazine.

Awards and honours
Kakakhail is the recipient of the Presidential Award for "Best Debator of Pakistan".  He is a well-known speaker throughout Pakistan who has lectured at various conferences, seminars, symposia and public gatherings by national universities such as Fast University Lahore, Kohat University of Science and Technology, International Islamic University, Islamabad and chambers of commerce and bar associations.

Literary works 
Kakakhail has authored several publications on various Shariah-related topics. He has also written more than 200 articles that have been published in leading  magazines and newspapers.

References

1975 births
Living people
Deobandis
University of Karachi alumni
Jamia Uloom-ul-Islamia alumni
University of Peshawar alumni
People from Nowshera District
Pakistani Islamic religious leaders
Pakistani Sunni Muslim scholars of Islam
Muslim missionaries
Pakistani religious writers
Jamia Tur Rasheed people
People from Islamabad